The 1856 United States presidential election in California took place on November 4, 1856 as part of the 1856 United States presidential election. Voters chose four representatives, or electors to the Electoral College, who voted for president and vice president.

California voted for the Democratic nominee, former Secretary of State James Buchanan, over the American Party nominee, former Whig President Millard Fillmore, and the Republican nominee, former U.S. Senator and Military Governor of California John C. Frémont.

Campaign
None of the three candidates took to the stump. The Republican Party opposed the extension of slavery into the territories — in fact, its slogan was "Free speech, free press, free soil, free men, Frémont and victory!" The Republicans thus crusaded against the Slave Power, warning it was destroying republican values. Democrats counter-crusaded by warning that a Republican victory would bring a civil war.

The Republican platform opposed the repeal of the Missouri Compromise through the Kansas–Nebraska Act, which enacted the policy of popular sovereignty, allowing settlers to decide whether a new state would enter the Union as free or slave. The Republicans also accused the Pierce administration of allowing a fraudulent territorial government to be imposed upon the citizens of the Kansas Territory, thus engendering the violence that had raged in Bleeding Kansas. They advocated the immediate admittance of Kansas as a free state. Along with opposing the spread of slavery into the continental territories of the United States, the party also opposed the Ostend Manifesto, which advocated the annexation of Cuba from Spain. In sum, the campaign's true focus was against the system of slavery, which they felt was destroying the Republican values that the Union had been founded upon.

The Democratic platform supported the Kansas-Nebraska Act and popular sovereignty. The party supported the pro-slavery territorial legislature elected in Kansas, opposed the free-state elements within Kansas, and castigated the Topeka Constitution as an illegal document written during an illegal convention. The Democrats also supported the plan to annex Cuba, advocated in the Ostend Manifesto, which Buchanan helped devise while serving as minister to Britain. The most influential aspect of the Democratic campaign was a warning that a Republican victory would lead to the secession of numerous southern states.

Results
This would prove the last occasion the Democratic Party carried Alameda County until Franklin Delano Roosevelt in 1932, the last in which the Democrats carried Santa Cruz County and Placer County until Woodrow Wilson in 1916, and the last when Napa, Solano and Marin Counties voted Democratic until Wilson in 1912. California's electoral votes would not be again carried by the Democratic Party until 1880.

References

Notes

California
1856
1856 California elections